Bernstein is a municipality in Burgenland in the district Oberwart in Austria.

Geography
Parts of the municipality are Dreihütten, Redlschlag, Rettenbach, and Stuben.

Population

Politics
Of the 23 positions on the municipal council, the SPÖ has 14, and the ÖVP 9.

Climate

Sightseeing
Bernstein Castle

Notable residents
 László Almásy (1895–1951): a Hungarian aristocrat, motorist, desert researcher, aviator, Scout-leader and soldier who served as the basis for the protagonist in Michael Ondaatje's 1992 novel The English Patient and the movie based on it.

References

External links
Aerial photography gallery

Cities and towns in Oberwart District